Jefferson Leonardo Pérez Quezada (born 1 July 1974) is an Ecuadorian retired race walker. He specialized in the 20 km event, in which he won the first two medals his country achieved in the Olympic Games.

Pérez won the gold medal at the 1996 Atlanta Olympics, becoming the youngest ever Olympic race walk champion. Following his win he embarked on a  pilgrimage, walking, jogging and running from Quito's Franciscan cathedral to his hometown of Cuenca. He took silver at the 1999 World Championships and then earned three consecutive world 20km race walk titles in 2003, 2005 and 2007. His winning time of 1:17:21 in 2003 became the first official world record for the event when standards for road events were recognised from 2004 onwards. At the 2008 Beijing Olympics, Pérez won silver in the same event. He had fourth-place finishes in the 20 km walk at the 2000 Sydney Olympics and the 2004 Athens Olympics.

Pérez announced his retirement from the sport in 2008.

Early life
Pérez was born in El Vecino, one of the oldest neighborhoods in Cuenca, to Manuel Jesús Pérez and María Lucrecia Quezada. Like others in his neighborhood, his family was of limited economic means.  He attended the elementary schools Eugenio Espejo and Gabriela Cevallos. Afterwards he entered the Francisco Febres Cordero high school, at the same time working to help out his family.  Graduated in Business Engineering from University of Azuay in Ecuador.  Obtained MBA (Master in Business Administration) from University of Azuay in Ecuador.

Career

Pérez entered race-walking by accident. To prepare for a walk that served as a high school physical education exam, he asked his brother Fabián to train for one week next to the group of athletes directed by trainer Luis Muñoz. Muñoz decided to invite him to compete in a race. With few weeks of preparation he won the race AID, winning the right of representing Ecuador in New York City and London as a sport ambassador.

Initially he participated in distance competitions of six kilometers. Later he had to make a radical decision, which was to dedicate himself completely to race walking. His first regional trophy in the 5K walk during the South American Pre-Junior championship held in his native city of Cuenca.

His first international achievement occurred when he won the bronze medal in the Junior World Cup of Athletics in Plovdiv, Bulgaria, in 1990.

Two years later, he won the Junior World title in Seoul, Korea, followed shortly by victories in South American and Pan-American open competitions.  His crowning achievement in race-walking came with a gold medal at the Atlanta Olympic Games in 1996. He won a silver medal, his second medal, at the Beijing Olympic Games.

He also won the silver at the World Championships of Seville in 1999, and unprecedented golds at Paris in 2003, Helsinki in 2005, and Osaka in 2007 for his third straight world title, the only person that has been able to achieve that. In France he broke the world record and he received a financial bonus.

Perez walked his final race at the World Race Walking Challenge final in Murcia, Spain. He finished third in that race and second in the overall challenge standings.

Personal bests

International competitions

In popular culture
He appeared on Japanese TV show Hey! Spring of Trivia multiple times - in one episode, he tested how long it actually took to walk to a train station from an apartment advertised as "5 minutes away" (for him, it took under 2 minutes); in another, the show tested whether he would walk or run away when threatened (he ran).

References

External links
 
 
 
 
 Photos about his technique
 

1974 births
Living people
People from Cuenca, Ecuador
Ecuadorian male racewalkers
Olympic athletes of Ecuador
Olympic gold medalists for Ecuador
Olympic silver medalists for Ecuador
Olympic gold medalists in athletics (track and field)
Olympic silver medalists in athletics (track and field)
Athletes (track and field) at the 1992 Summer Olympics
Athletes (track and field) at the 1996 Summer Olympics
Athletes (track and field) at the 2000 Summer Olympics
Athletes (track and field) at the 2004 Summer Olympics
Athletes (track and field) at the 2008 Summer Olympics
Medalists at the 1996 Summer Olympics
Medalists at the 2008 Summer Olympics
Pan American Games gold medalists for Ecuador
Pan American Games medalists in athletics (track and field)
Athletes (track and field) at the 1995 Pan American Games
Athletes (track and field) at the 1999 Pan American Games
Athletes (track and field) at the 2003 Pan American Games
Athletes (track and field) at the 2007 Pan American Games
Goodwill Games medalists in athletics
World Athletics Championships athletes for Ecuador
World Athletics Championships medalists
World record setters in athletics (track and field)
South American Games gold medalists for Ecuador
South American Games medalists in athletics
Competitors at the 1998 South American Games
World Athletics Race Walking Team Championships winners
World Athletics Championships winners
Competitors at the 2001 Summer Universiade
Competitors at the 1998 Goodwill Games
Medalists at the 1995 Pan American Games
Medalists at the 1999 Pan American Games
Medalists at the 2003 Pan American Games
Medalists at the 2007 Pan American Games
20th-century Ecuadorian people
21st-century Ecuadorian people